Luiz Henrique de Oliveira or simply Luiz Henrique (born 3 September 1985 n São Paulo) is a Brazilian attacking midfielder who plays for Velo Clube in the Brazilian Campeonato Paulista de Futebol .

References

External links
 santos.globo.com
 Luis changes to LASK Linz
 Reforços XV de Jaú 2016

1985 births
Living people
Brazilian footballers
América Futebol Clube (SP) players
Paulista Futebol Clube players
Santos FC players
LASK players
Expatriate footballers in Vietnam
Association football midfielders
Footballers from São Paulo